Amsler Island is a small island off the south coast of Anvers Island in the Palmer Archipelago of Antarctica. It sits between Loudwater Cove and Arthur Harbour.

Narrow Norsel Point, formerly considered a headland of Arthur Harbour, marks its westernmost extremity.

Geography 
Three prominent rocks called the Elephant Rocks sit just to the south of Amsler Island, between the coast and Torgersen Island. The rocks are connected to one another by sandy shoals. Their name became established locally among United States Antarctic Program (USAP) personnel at nearby Palmer Station in about 1971, as the rocks provide habitat favoured by elephant seals.

History 
Amsler Island was once thought to be a part of Anvers Island because the gap between the islands was covered by the Marr Ice Piedmont. The southern coast of Anvers Island, including the land now known as Amsler Island, was originally surveyed by the Falkland Islands Dependencies Survey (FIDS) in 1955. Norsel Point, thought to be a point on the coast of Arthur Harbour, was named by the United Kingdom Antarctic Place-names Committee (UK-APC) after the Norwegian sealing vessel , which sailed with the FIDS survey.

Rapid recession of the ice due to global warming revealed Amsler Island as a separate island in 2004. The United States Board on Geographic Names named Amsler Island in recognition of American marine biologists Charles and Margaret Amsler of the University of Alabama at Birmingham, who had researched the area for over three decades. The name Norsel Point was retained.

See also 
 Composite Antarctic Gazetteer
 List of Antarctic islands south of 60° S
 SCAR 
 Territorial claims in Antarctica

References

External links
 press release on island
 newspaper article on island
 

Islands of the Palmer Archipelago
Geography of Anvers Island